Eleuterio Fernández Huidobro (March 14, 1942 – August 5, 2016) was an Uruguayan politician, journalist, and writer. He was popularly known as "El Ñato". A former member of the National Liberation Movement (Tupamaros) (MLN-T), he was in prison during the military dictatorship for twelve years (1973-1985).

He was the Minister of Defense from 2011 until his death. On August 5, 2016, he died in office at the age of 74.

His 12-year tenure in prison during Uruguay's military dictatorship with Mauricio Rosencof and José Mujica was the basis for the film A Twelve-Year Night.

References

External links

1942 births
2016 deaths
People from Montevideo
Uruguayan people of Spanish descent
Broad Front (Uruguay) politicians
Defence ministers of Uruguay
Burials at Cementerio del Buceo, Montevideo